Shanghai Indoor Stadium is an interchange station between lines 1 and 4 of the Shanghai Metro. This station is part of the initial southern section of the line that opened on 28 May 1993 and is located in Xuhui District; the interchange with Line 4 opened on 31 December 2005.

Name 
The Chinese name of this station (literally Shanghai Sports Hall) refers to the nearby Shanghai Indoor Stadium. However, the station used to bear the English name Shanghai Stadium, referring to the adjacent outdoor stadium called Shanghai Stadium instead of the indoor stadium. After the opening of the nearby Shanghai Stadium Station specifically for the outdoor stadium, that station took the English name Shanghai Stadium, while this station was renamed Shanghai Indoor Stadium, now better reflecting the Chinese name.

Station Layout

Nearby locations 

 Shanghai Indoor Stadium
 Shanghai Stadium
 Sightseeing bus station, with shuttle buses to Sheshan Forest Park and other destinations

Accidents 
In 2007, a man tried to board a crowded train but was unable to. The automatic glass sliding doors closed in on him and he was dragged underneath the train, killing him.

References 

Shanghai Metro stations in Xuhui District
Line 1, Shanghai Metro
Line 4, Shanghai Metro
Railway stations in China opened in 1993
Railway stations in Shanghai